Remizov is a Russian masculine surname, its feminine counterpart is Remizova. It may refer to
Aleksey Remizov (1877–1957), Russian modernist writer
Igor Remizov (born 1970), Russian football player
Mikhail Remizov (1948–2015), Russian stage and film actor
 Nicolai Remizov (1887-1975), Russian artist and art director

See also
Remezov

Russian-language surnames